The dusky snout catshark (Bythaelurus naylori) is a catshark of the family Scyliorhinidae. This species is found from the Southwest Indian Ridge, southwestern
Indian Ocean. The specimens were collected from 89–1,443 m depth in both bottom trawls and midwater trawls. The shallowest catch record of the new species, possibly at 89 m, came from a midwater trawl. This species can be distinguished from its two closest congeners, B. giddingsi and B. lutarius, by a combination of prominent comb-like dermal denticles along the upper caudal-fin margin, absence of oral papillae, uniform body coloration, and noticeable dark dusky snout; Bythaelurus giddingsi has oral papillae present and a variegated color pattern, while B. lutarius lacks a caudal crest of enlarged denticles and matures at a much smaller size than the new species.

References

dusky snout catshark
Fish of the Indian Ocean
dusky snout catshark